Events from the year 1933 in Scotland.

Incumbents 

 Secretary of State for Scotland and Keeper of the Great Seal – Sir Godfrey Collins

Law officers 
 Lord Advocate – Craigie Mason Aitchison until October; then Wilfrid Normand
 Solicitor General for Scotland – Wilfrid Normand until October; then Douglas Jamieson

Judiciary 
 Lord President of the Court of Session and Lord Justice General – Lord Clyde
 Lord Justice Clerk – Lord Alness, then Lord Aitchison
 Chairman of the Scottish Land Court – Lord St Vigeans

Events 
 2 February – East Fife by-election: The seat is retained by the National Liberal Party; Eric Linklater stands for the National Party of Scotland.
 3 April – Two British aircraft piloted by Squadron Leader the Marquess of Clydesdale and Flight Lieutenant David MacIntyre make the first flight over Mount Everest.
 30 April – First domestic flight service in Scotland, Renfrew to Campbeltown, operated by Midland & Scottish Air Ferries Ltd. Winifred Drinkwater, "the world's first female commercial pilot", is hired to fly the route.
 2 May – First modern "sighting" of the Loch Ness Monster.
 28 July – Administration of Justice (Scotland) Act 1933 receives the Royal Assent.
 9 August – Hoard of silver denarii and a contemporaneous fragment of tartan cloth found at Falkirk.
 2 November – Kilmarnock by-election: The seat is retained by the National Labour Organisation; Sir Alexander MacEwen stands for the Scottish Party with the endorsement of the National Party of Scotland.
 Scottish Democratic Fascist Party founded by William Weir Gilmour and Major Hume Sleigh to oppose Irish Catholic emigration to Scotland.

Births 
 11 January – Duncan Glen, poet, literary editor and Professor of Visual Communication (died 2008)
 4 February – Jimmy Murray, footballer (died 2015)
 18 February – Mary Ure, actress (died 1975 in London)
 7 March – Donald Douglas, actor
 2 April – Donald Gorrie, Liberal Democrat politician and MSP (died 2012)
 10 May – Harold Davis, Scottish football player, manager (died 2018) 
 10 June – Ian Campbell, folk singer (died 2012)
 30 June – Dave Duncan, fantasy and science fiction writer, resident in Canada (died 2018 in Canada)
 13 July – Patricia Leitch writer, best known for children's books (died 2015)
 12 August – Frederic Lindsay, writer of crime fiction (died 2013)
 12 September – Felix Reilly, footballer (died 2018)
 19 September – David McCallum, actor
 11 November – Alexander Goudie, painter (died 2004)
 26 November – Richard Holloway, Bishop of Edinburgh in the Scottish Episcopal Church
 19 December – Christopher Smout academic, historian, author and Historiographer Royal in Scotland
 24 December – Nicholas Fairbairn, lawyer and Conservative politician (died 1995)
 30 December – Andy Stewart, singer (died 1993)
 Michael Deacon, actor (died 2000 in London)
 Alan Watson, legal scholar (died 2018)

Deaths 
 10 January – Margaret Macdonald Mackintosh, artist and designer (born 1864)
 16 February - George Beatson, physician, pioneer in the field of oncology (born 1848 in Trincomalee) 
 16 February - Dorothy Carleton Smyth, artist and designer (born 1880)
 4 May - Alexander Marshall Mackenzie, architect (born 1848) 
 30 June – Edward Atkinson Hornel, painter (born 1864 in Australia)
 25 July – John May, international footballer (born 1878)
 31 July – Robert Fleming, financier (born 1845)
 30 December – Dugald Cowan, educationalist and Liberal politician (born 1865)
 Janet Milne Rae, novelist (born 1844)

The arts
 May – the first radio play in Gaelic, Dunach, is broadcast by the BBC.
 The Curtain Theatre (Glasgow) presents its first season.
 Erik Chisholm composes his Straloch Suite.
 Agnes Mure Mackenzie publishes An Historical Survey of Scottish Literature to 1714.
 Nan Shepherd publishes her last novel A Pass in the Grampians.

See also 
 Timeline of Scottish history
 1933 in Northern Ireland

References 

 
Years of the 20th century in Scotland
Scotland
1930s in Scotland